Methanogenium marinum is a psychrophilic, H2-using methanogen from Skan Bay, Alaska. Its cells are highly irregular, non-motile coccoids (diameter, 1 to 1.2 μm), occurring singly. AK-1 is its type strain.

Morphology
The cells are highly irregular and coccoid in shape and non-motile, 1 to 1.2 μm in diameter. Like other species within the genus Methanogenium, they are strictly anaerobic.

References

Further reading

External links 

LPSN
WORMS entry
Type strain of Methanogenium marinum at BacDive -  the Bacterial Diversity Metadatabase

Archaea described in 2002
Euryarchaeota